The American Association of Colleges of Osteopathic Medicine Application Service (AACOMAS) is a service run by the American Association of Colleges of Osteopathic Medicine through which prospective osteopathic medical students can apply to osteopathic medical schools in the United States that grant the Doctor of Osteopathic Medicine degree.

Medical schools in the United States that grant the Doctor of Medicine degree use either the American Medical College Application Service (AMCAS) or the Texas Medical & Dental Schools Application Service (TMDSAS). Sam Houston State University College of Osteopathic Medicine and the University of North Texas Health Science Center Texas College of Osteopathic Medicine are the only osteopathic medical schools that do not use AACOMAS.

Participating osteopathic medical schools

References

External links

Medical education in the United States